Bruce Museum may refer to:

Bruce Museum of Arts and Science, Greenwich, Connecticut, United States
Bruce County Museum and Cultural Centre, Southampton, Ontario, Canada